Carlton railway station serves the suburb of Carlton, Nottinghamshire, England.

History
It opened on 3 August 1846. The station was renamed from Carlton & Netherfield to Carlton on 6 May 1974.

Stationmasters

Edward Black ca. 1861 - 1862
W. Duddle 1862 - 1862
R. Fox 1863 - 1866
John Sawyer from 1866 
Owen Beldham ca. 1871 - 1872
R. Grice 1872 - 1873
John Bradshaw Bott 1874 - 1878 (afterwards station master at Attenborough)
Charles Smith 1878 - 1892 (afterwards station master at Lenton)
W.H. Turner 1892 - 1914 
Charles Williams from 1914 
C. Bywater 1926 - 1932  (formerly station master at Castlethorpe, afterwards station master at Nuneaton Abbey Street)
William Gale ca. 1934 ca. 1939
C.S. Barnard ca. 1950

Description
The station has two staggered platforms, there is a level crossing on Victoria Road, hence the staggered platforms to minimise delay to road traffic, and Carlton's centre is a considerable distance further away than Netherfield's, but the nearby Netherfield railway station on the neighbouring Nottingham-Skegness line had already taken that name.

Service
There is a reduced service on Sundays.

The station has a PlusBus scheme where train and bus tickets can be bought together for a cheaper price. It is in the same area as Beeston, Bulwell, Netherfield and Nottingham stations.

References

External links

Railway stations in Nottinghamshire
DfT Category F2 stations
Former Midland Railway stations
Railway stations in Great Britain opened in 1846
Railway stations served by East Midlands Railway
1846 establishments in England
Gedling